The Evening and the Morning is a historical fiction novel by Welsh author Ken Follett. It is a prequel to The Pillars of the Earth set starting in 997 CE, and covering a period in the late Dark Ages and under the backdrop of Viking raids, through the year 1007 CE. The book expands upon the history and founding of the fictional town of Kingsbridge, England, and the construction of the bridge and cathedral there (and the origin of the town's name is explained). It was released on September 15, 2020.

The title is in Genesis 1:5. Follett has said that he has chosen biblical quotes for the titles of all his Kingsbridge novels as feels that they have a more powerful and epic feeling. 

A series based on the book is in the works at Legendary Television and Range Media Partners.

Characters
 Ragna: Daughter of Count Hubert of Cherbourg, travels to England after marrying Ealdorman Wilwulf of Shiring.
 Aldred: A young monk who wishes on making Shiring a center of learning by creating a vast library.
 Edgar: The son of a boatbuilder that dreams of being a builder himself.
 Ealdorman Wilwulf (Also referred as Wilf): The older half-brother of Wynstan and Wigelm, and ealdorman of Shiring. He marries Ragna against the king's will after falling in love with her on a trip to Cherbourg.
 Bishop Wynstan: a greedy bishop obsessed with power, who uses his wit in order for his family to increase their wealth and social status.
 Wigelm: the younger brother of Wynstan and half-brother of Wilwulf.

References

External links
 The Evening and the Morning on Ken Follett's website

Novels set in Anglo-Saxon England
Ken Follett